Geylang was a constituency of the Legislative Assembly of Singapore. It came into existence in 1955 by the delimiting of the preceding Katong Constituency of the Legislative Council. The constituency was split into Geylang East and Geylang West at the next election, in 1959.

Member of the Legislative Assembly

Elections

Elections in 1950s

Historical maps

References

Singaporean electoral divisions
Geylang